Bock is a surname. Notable people with the surname include:

 Adam Bock, Canadian playwright
 Audie Bock, American film scholar and politician
 Brittany Bock, American soccer player
 Carl Ernst Bock (1809–1874), German anatomist
 Charles Bock, American writer
 Darrell Bock, research professor of New Testament studies in Dallas, Texas
 Dennis Bock, Canadian novelist
 Eberhardt Otto George von Bock (d. 1814), Hanoverian cavalry general
 Ernest-Camille Bock (1894–1952), governor of Orientale Province in the Belgian Congo from 1945 to 1952.
 Fedor von Bock (1880–1945), German field marshal of World War II
 Friedrich Samuel Bock, German philosopher and theologian
 Gisela Bock, German historian
 Hans Bock (chemist) (1928–2008), German chemist
 Hans Bock (painter), 16th-century German painter
 Hans Georg Bock (born 1948), German professor of mathematics and scientific computing
 Heini Bock, Namibian rugby union scrum-half
 Hieronymus Bock (1498–1554), medieval German botanist
 Larry Bock (1959–2016), American entrepreneur
 Ior Bock, Finnish historian
 Jerry Bock, American musical theatre composer
 John Bock, German artist
 Karolina Bock, Swedish dancer, actor and singer
 Kate Bock, fashion model
 Mathieu Bock-Côté, Québécois journalist
 Michel Bock, Canadian historian
 Nathalie Bock, German football midfielder
 Nathan Bock, Australian rules footballer
 Otto Bock, Danish athlete
 Peter Bock, American politician
 Rainer Bock, German actor
 Richard Bock (1865–1949), American sculptor
 Rolf Bock, German football manager
 Thomas Bock (1793–1855), Australian artist
 Ute Bock (1942–2018), Austrian educator
 Walter Bock (1895–1948), German chemist

See also
 Tan Cheng Bock, Singaporean politician (surname Tan, given name Cheng Bock)

Surnames from nicknames